Behruzi Khojazoda (born 11 January 1995) is a Tajikistani male kurash practitioner as well as a judoka who has represented Tajikistan in several international competitive events.

He represented Tajikistan at the 2018 Asian Games and claimed silver medal in the men's 81kg kurash event. Behruzi also competed in the men's judo 73kg event during the 2018 Asian Games.

References

External links
 

1995 births
Living people
Tajikistani male martial artists
Tajikistani male judoka
Kurash practitioners at the 2018 Asian Games
Judoka at the 2018 Asian Games
Medalists at the 2018 Asian Games
Asian Games silver medalists for Tajikistan
Asian Games medalists in kurash
Sportspeople from Dushanbe